The following is a list of all ASC X12 transaction sets across all releases.

X12C: Communications and Controls

X12F: Finance

X12I: Transportation

X12M: Supply Chain

X12N: Insurance

References

See also
 Electronic Data Interchange
 EDIFACT
 X12 EDIFACT Mapping
 ANSI 834 Enrollment Implementation Format

Electronic data interchange